Marvin R. Weatherwax Jr. is an American politician. He is a Democrat representing District 15 in the Montana House of Representatives.

Personal life 

Weatherwax holds an associate's degree in computer science from Blackfeet Community College. He lives in Browning, Montana.

Political career 

In 2018, former District 15 Representative George Kipp III did not run for re-election. Weatherwax ran for the seat and was unopposed in both the Democratic primary and the general election. He is running for re-election in 2020.

As of June 2020, Weatherwax sits on the following committees:
 Fish, Wildlife, and Parks
 Natural Resources
 State Administration

References 

Democratic Party members of the Montana House of Representatives
Living people
Native American state legislators in Montana
People from Browning, Montana
Year of birth missing (living people)
21st-century American politicians